Aihwa Ong (born February 1, 1950) is Professor of Anthropology at the University of California, Berkeley, a member of the Science Council of the International Panel on Social Progress, and a former recipient of a MacArthur Fellowship for the study of sovereignty and citizenship. She is well known for her interdisciplinary approach in investigations of globalization, modernity, and citizenship from Southeast Asia and China to the Pacific Northwest of the United States. Her notions of 'flexible citizenship', 'graduated sovereignty,' and 'global assemblages' have widely impacted conceptions of the global in modernity across the social sciences and humanities. 
She is specifically interested in the connection and links between an array of social sciences such as; socio cultural anthropology, urban studies, science technology, and is even interested in medicine and the arts.

Life and career
Ong was born in Penang, Malaysia to a Straits Chinese family in 1950. She received her B.A. in anthropology (1974) from Barnard College and earned her Ph.D. (1982) in anthropology from Columbia University. She was a visiting lecturer at Hampshire College (1982–84) before joining the Department of Anthropology at the University of California Berkeley (1984 – present). She was the Chair of the Center for Southeast Asian Studies, Berkeley (1999–2001), Visiting Professor at City University of Hong Kong (2001), Visiting Professor at Yonsei University (2010), and a senior researcher at the Asia Research Institute of the National University of Singapore (2010). 

Ong was awarded a MacArthur Fellowship for the study of sovereignty and citizenship (2001-2003) and has been awarded grants from the National Science Foundation and the Sloan Foundation for the Social Science Research Council. She received the Cultural Studies Book Award for Flexible Citizenship (1999) from the Association for Asian American Studies as well as a prize from the American Ethnological Society. In addition, she received honorable mention for Buddha is Hiding (2003) from the Society for Urban, National, and Transnational Anthropology.

In 2007, Ong was invited to the World Economic Forum in Davos. She was the Chair of the US National Committee for Pacific Science Association from 2009-2011, and was named Robert H. Lowie Distinguished Chair in Anthropology in 2015. She continues to teach, publish, and lecture internationally.

Academic work
Aihwa Ong's work deals with particular entanglements of politics, technology, ethics and affects in rapidly changing situations on the Asia Pacific rim. Ong approaches research from vantage points outside or athwart the United States. This angle of inquiry unsettles and troubles stabilized viewpoints and units of analysis in the social sciences, such as gender, class, citizenship, cities, sovereignty and the nation-state.

As an anthropologist, Ong employs ethnographic observation and analytical concept-work to investigate diverse subjective and institutional effects of the global on emerging situations for ways of being human today. From the novel freedoms and accompanying restrictions experienced by Malaysian female workers in multinational factories to the accumulative strategies of Asian entrepreneurs in relocating family and capital overseas; from the disciplining of Cambodian refugees towards an embrace of American values to the neoliberal reasoning and graduated modes of governing at work; from the transformation of cities to the rise of contemporary art in Asia; Ong's work tracks the interplay of global forces and everyday practices as they crystallize into myriad and uneven contexts for human living and belonging in modernity.

Her current work focuses on regimes of governing, technology, and culture that shape new meanings and practices of the human in an emerging global region. Her field research shifts between Singapore and China in order to track emerging global hubs for biotechnical experiments with genomic science in contemporary East Asia.

Work Overview

Buddha Is Hiding (2003)

This book speaks about the Cambodian refugees in America and their experience and adventure with American citizenship. It explains how the Cambodian refugees earn their American citizenship by working their way up through society the hard way. Ong also concentrates on the activity behind American institutions and how it affects the minority citizens in the society, in terms of health care, law, welfare, etc. 

Mutations in Citizenship (2006)

This book shows us how the mutations in citizenship are continuously moving, flowing and changing according to markets, technologies, societies and the population of the society. Ong starts by identifying the elements of citizenship such as citizen’s rights and laws etc. These citizens' rights are becoming incoherent from each other and being reformed to the criteria of neoliberalism and human rights. She also shows us that the “assemblage” are being taken over by political mobilizations of diverse groups instead of national terrain. In Europe, the amount of migrant flows and unregulated markets are what challenges liberal citizenship. But in Asia, foreigners who establish businesses or become entrepreneurs in the Asian region have the rights and the benefits of a citizen, so this shows us the contradiction and unfair problem between Europe and Asia. 

Asian Biotech: Ethics and Communities of Fate (2010)

This book shows us a glimpse of the emerging biosciences landscape in Asia. Ong provided a collection of case studies on biotech topics including genetically modified foods, clinical trials, blood collection, stem cell research etc. These are studies conducted all over Asia in countries such as Singapore, China and India. 

Fungible Life: Experiment in the Asian City Of Life (2016)

In this book, Ong speaks about the world of bioscience research and explains how Asian biosciences and cosmopolitan sciences go hand in hand and are connected in a tropical climate having the threat of many diseases. She presents examples of biomedical centers in Asia, such as Singapore and China and explains how they map genetic variants, disease risks, biomarkers, etc. Singapore is a diverse country with citizens having an array of many nationalities. Singapore’s diverse population makes a good example for ethnic stratified databases that represent the populations in Asia. Allowing public access to genomic science in Asia, researchers and scientists will be able to study and discover the relationships between people, objects and spaces, these researches will eventually make a big impact and evolution in the scientific field and put Asia on the map for these discoveries.

Publications

Books and edited volumes 

Fungible Life: Experiment in the Asian City of Life, Duke University Press, 2016.   
Worlding Cities: Asian Experiments with the Art of Being Global, ed. with Ananya Roy, Wiley-Blackwell, 2011.   
Asian Biotech: Ethics and Communities of Fate, ed. with Nancy N. Chen, Duke University Press, 2010.   
Privatizing China, Socialism from Afar, ed. with Li Zhang, Cornell University Press, 2008.   
Neoliberalism as Exception: Mutations in Citizenship and Sovereignty, Duke University Press, 2006 [Italian, Japanese].   
Global Assemblages: Technology, Politics, and Ethics as Anthropological Problems, ed. with Stephen J. Collier, Blackwell Publishers, 2005. 
Buddha is Hiding: Refugees, Citizenship, the New America, University of California Press, 2003 [Italian]. 
Flexible Citizenship: The Cultural Logics of Transnationality, 1999 [German]. Recipient of the Cultural Studies Book Award by the Association of Asian American Studies in 2001.
Ungrounded Empires: The Cultural Politics of Modern Chinese Transnationalism, ed. with Donald Nonini, Routledge, 1997.
Bewitching Women, Pious Men: Gender and Labor Politics in Southeast Asia, ed. with Michael Peletz, University of California Press, 1995.
Spirits of Resistance and Capitalist Discipline: Factory Women in Malaysia , State University of New York Press, 1987 [2010].

Selected articles and chapters 

 "Why Singapore Trumps Iceland: Gathering Genes in the Wild," Journal of Cultural Economy, vol. 8, no. 3, 2015.
 "A Milieu of Mutations: The Pluripotency and Fungibility of Life in Asia," East Asian Science, Technology and Society, 7, (2013).
 "What Marco Polo Forgot: Asian Art Negotiates the Global," Current Anthropology, vol. 53, no. 4 (2012).
 "Hyperbuilding: Spectacle, Speculation, and the Hyperspace of Sovereignty," in Worlding Cities eds. Ananya Roy and Aihwa Ong, Wiley-Blackwell, 2011.
 "The Human and Ethical Living," in Globalizing the Research Imagination, Jane Kenway and Johannah Fahey eds. pp. 87–100. London: Routledge (2008).
 "Neoliberalism as a Mobile Technology," Transactions of the Institute of British Geographers, vol. 32, no. 3 (2007).
 "Please Stay: Pied-a-Terre Subjects in the Megacity," Citizenship Studies, vol. 11, no. 1 (2007).
 "Mutations in Citizenship," Theory, Culture, and Society, vol. 22, no. 3, (2006).
 "Experiments with Freedom: Milieus of the Human," American Literary History , vol. 8, no. 2 (2006).
 "(Re)Articulations of Citizenship," Political Science and Politics, vol. 38, no. 4 (2005).
 "The Chinese Axis: Zoning Technologies and Variegated Sovereignty," Journal of East Asian Studies, vol. 4, no. 1 (2004).
 "Cyberpublics and Diaspora Politics among Transnational Chinese," Interventions, vol. 5, no. 1 (2003).
 "A Higher Learning: Educational Availability and Flexible Citizenship in Global Space," in Diversity and Citizenship Education, ed. James Banks, Wiley, 2003.
 "Graduated Sovereignty in Southeast Asia," Theory, Culture, and Society, vol. 17, no. 4 (2000).
 "Muslim Feminists in the Shelter of Corporate Islam," Citizenship Studies, vol. 3, no. 3 (1999).
 "Strategic Sisterhood or Sisters in Solidarity? Questions of Communitarianism and Citizenship in Asia," Indiana Journal of Global Legal Studies, vol. 4, no. 1 (1996).
 "Cultural Citizenship as Subject-Making: New Immigrants Negotiate Racial and Ethnic Boundaries," Current Anthropology, vol. 37, no. 5 (1996).
 "On the Edge of Empires: Flexible Citizenship among Chinese in Diaspora," Positions, vol. 1, no. 3 (1995).
 "The Gender and Labor Politics of Postmodernity," Annual Review of Anthropology, vol. 20 (1991).
 "State versus Islam: Malay Families, Women's Bodies, and the Body Politic in Malaysia," American Ethnologist, vol. 17, no. 2 (1991).
 "The Production of Possession: Spirits and Multinational Corporation in Malaysia," American Ethnologist, vol. 15, no. 1 (1988).

References

External links
University of California, Berkeley Faculty Page https://web.archive.org/web/20111113195212/http://anthropology.berkeley.edu/users/aihwa-ong 
Personal Page http://www.aihwaong.info 
https://www.researchgate.net/profile/Aihwa_Ong

University of California, Berkeley faculty
Columbia Graduate School of Arts and Sciences alumni
Barnard College alumni
People from Penang
Malaysian academics
Living people
Peranakan people in Malaysia
1950 births
MacArthur Fellows
Anthropologists